Diporiphora linga, the pink two-line dragon, is a species of agama found in Australia.

References

Diporiphora
Agamid lizards of Australia
Taxa named by Terry Francis Houston
Reptiles described in 1977